Hafar al-Batin, also frequently spelled Hafr al-Batin, is a Saudi Arabian city in the Eastern Province. It is located 430 km north of Riyadh, 94.2 km from the Kuwait border, and about 74.3 from the Iraq border.  The city lies in the dry valley of the Wadi al-Batin, which is part of the longer valley of the river Wadi al-Rummah (now dry), which leads inland toward Medina and formerly emptied into the Persian Gulf.

History

In the 1st century after hijrah or 638 CE, Hafar al-Batin was just a route in the desert that pilgrims passed through traveling to Mecca for Hajj. At that time, there was no water available in this land, so the pilgrims travelled from Iraq to Mecca on a long route without water. During the reign of Uthman (644 - 656 CE), many pilgrims complained about the lack of water, and Abu-Musa al-Asha'ari, a companion of the Islamic prophet Muhammad responded by digging new wells along the route in the al-Batin valley. The name of Hafar al-Batin ("the hole of al-Batin Valley") is derived from this.. It was part of Kuwait before the Uqair Protocol of 1922 in which it was given to Saudi Arabia.

The Saudi Arabia Ministry of Housing announced in August 2020 that they would be including Hafr Al Batin in its program to increase residential ownership by its citizens. The ministry will be providing 759 plots in Hafr Al Batin alone.

Population
In 2010, Hafar al-Batin, had more than 35 villages in its suburban area and the total population reached 400,993 to 600,000
Hafar al-Batin about +300,642 
Qaisumah about +22,538 
Al-Theebiyah about +14,442 
Ar Raqa'i +5,665 
As Su'ayerah about +3,607
As Sufayri about +2,481 
Al-Qalt - Ibn Tuwalah about +1,128 
Samoudah about +914
As Sadawi about +822
Um Qulaib about +612 
An Nazim about +585 
Dhabhah about +267
Um Ashar about +73 
Al-Metiahah Al-Janobiyah about +61
Al-Hamatiyat about +17

Transportation

Airport
For full international service, the city is served by King Fahd International Airport with driving distance of 450 km.

Nonetheless, Hafar al-Batin has two airports: One with limited domestic flights (Qaisumah)  airport about 20 km in the southeast, and one for military use only (King Khaled Military City Airport)  about 70 km in the southwest.

Roads
All the downtown roads of Hafar al-Batin are paved. It is connected with an international network of roads, connecting Saudi Arabia with Kuwait in the East and connecting the North with the Eastern Province.

Districts

Al-Aziziah A
Al-Aziziah B
Al-Aziziah69Al-KhalediyahAl-RabwahAl-MuhammadiyahAl-BaladiyahAl-RawdhahAl-NayefiyahAl-SulaimaniyahAl-FaisaliyahAbu-Musa al-Asha'ari'''

Climate
The climate in general is hot and dry, and it rains only during winter months.

Köppen-Geiger climate classification system classifies its climate as hot desert (BWh).

Gallery

See also 

 List of cities and towns in Saudi Arabia
 Eastern Province, Saudi Arabia
 Al Batin FC

Notes

References
 Central Department of Statistics and Informations 
 The Saudi Arabian Information Resource
 Otaishan assigned governor of Hafr albatin 2011 

Populated places in Eastern Province, Saudi Arabia
Geography of Saudi Arabia